The columns Song, Album, and Year list each song title, the official release on which the song first appeared, and the year in which the song was released for the first time. The columns Length, Author, and Producer indicate the length of the track, the author of the song (most often Wainwright alone), and the producer of the track. References are also provided for each song in the last column of the table. While many songs listed appear on multiple releases (for example, "Spotlight on Christmas" appears on Maybe This Christmas Too?, The McGarrigle Christmas Hour, and Elton John's Christmas Party), songs are listed based on the first release and only appear twice when the recordings have different production information (producer, length, etc.).

The list includes original songs released on studio recordings, songs written but not performed by Wainwright, original songs performed live, and recorded cover songs.

Original songs

Studio recordings
Following is a list of original songs by Wainwright that have been released on a studio album, EP, soundtrack, compilation album, single, or DVD. Also included is "Ode to Antidote", a studio-quality promotional single used to promote a perfume by Viktor & Rolf, and "Patience is a Virtue", an original song available via digital download on Wal-Mart's website with the purchase of Release the Stars.

Songs written, but not performed, by Wainwright
Following is a chart containing songs originally written or co-written by Wainwright that do not appear on one of his original albums. The list includes songs performed solely by other artists and those that feature Wainwright as a co-lead or backing vocalist.

Demo recordings
These songs appear on Wainwright's 1995 demo cassette (Desdemona Publishing) recorded by Pierre Marchand.

Side A
"Foolish Love" – 5:13
"Heart Like a Highway" (also known as "That Night") – 4:15
"Money Song" (also known as "The Money Song") – 4:59
"Danny Boy" – 5:01

Side B
"Beauty Mark" – 2:06
"Damned Ladies" – 3:39
"Liberty Cabbage" – 3:40
"Ashes" – 4:40
"Matinée Idol" – 3:19

Songs performed live
Following is a list of songs by Wainwright that have been performed live but have yet to appear on an official release:

 "Christmas is for Kids"
 "Rainbow Crossing"
 "Schubert Song"

 "The Bela Song"
 "Two Gold Rings (Trafalgar Square)"
 "Lucy's Blue"

Songs written for stage
 "One's-Self I Sing" (Walt Whitman), "Lux Aeterna Luceat Eis, Domine", "Unseen Buds" (Whitman), and "Hope Is the Thing With Feathers" (Emily Dickinson) were part of a six-movement choral collection composed for the Stephen Petronio Company production Bloom in 2006.
 Based on Shakespeare's sonnets, "Sonnet 10", "Sonnet 20", and "Sonnet 43" were originally composed for Robert Wilson's staging of Shakespeares Sonette in Berlin in April 2009.

Cover songs

See also 
List of awards and nominations received by Rufus Wainwright
Rufus Wainwright discography

References

External links
Rufus Wainwright's official site
Rufus Wainwright at Geffen Records

Wainwright, Rufus
Wainwright, Rufus
Rufus Wainwright songs